Marat Ganeyev (born 6 December 1964) is a retired track cyclist from Russia, who won the bronze medal for the Soviet Union in the men's points race at the 1988 Summer Olympics in Seoul, South Korea. He was a professional road cyclist from 1989 to 1998.

Major results

1983
1st Prologue Tour Européen Lorraine-Alsace
1984
2nd Overall International Tour of Hellas
1985
1st  Overall Tour du Maroc
2nd Overall International Tour of Hellas
1986
1st Stage 8 Olympia's Tour
1995
3rd Nationale Sluitingprijs - Putte - Kapellen

References

External links

1964 births
Living people
Cyclists at the 1988 Summer Olympics
Olympic bronze medalists for the Soviet Union
Olympic cyclists of the Soviet Union
Russian male cyclists
Tatar people of Russia
Russian track cyclists
Olympic medalists in cycling
People from Naberezhnye Chelny
Medalists at the 1988 Summer Olympics
Sportspeople from Tatarstan